The 2017 Internationaux de Tennis de Vendée was a professional tennis tournament played on hard courts. It was the fifth edition of the tournament which was part of the 2017 ATP Challenger Tour. It took place in Mouilleron-le-Captif, France between 6 and 12 November 2017.

Singles main-draw entrants

Seeds

 1 Rankings are as of 30 October 2017.

Other entrants
The following players received wildcards into the singles main draw:
  Geoffrey Blancaneaux
  Ugo Humbert
  Tom Jomby
  Benoît Paire

The following players received entry from the qualifying draw:
  Ilya Ivashka
  Maxime Janvier
  Constant Lestienne
  Yannik Reuter

The following player received entry as a lucky loser:
  Romain Barbosa

Champions

Singles

 Elias Ymer def.  Yannick Maden 7–5, 6–4.

Doubles

 Andre Begemann /  Jonathan Eysseric def.  Tomasz Bednarek /  David Pel 6–3, 6–4.

External links
Official Website

Internationaux de Tennis de Vendee
Internationaux de Tennis de Vendée